Indonesia first participated at the Youth Olympic Games at the inaugural 2010 Games. Indonesia has never participated in the Winter Youth Olympic Games.

Medal tables

Medals by Summer Games

Medals by Summer sport

List of medalists

Summer Games

Competitors 
Summer Games

Flag bearers

See also 
Indonesia at the Olympics
Indonesia at the Paralympics

 
Nations at the Youth Olympic Games